A brakeman is a rail transport worker whose original job was to assist the braking of a train by applying brakes on individual wagons. The advent of through brakes, brakes on every wagon which could be controlled by the  driver, made this role redundant, although the name lives on, for example, in the United States where brakemen carry out a variety of functions both on the track and within trains.

By country

Germany 

In Germany, the brakemen occupied brakeman's cabins on several or even all wagons in a train and would operate the wagon brakes when signaled by the engine driver. It was a dangerous and uncomfortable role, especially in winter when it was not uncommon for brakemen to freeze to death in the unheated cabins.

The function was abolished in the 1920s with the introduction of air brakes, which could be controlled by the engine driver.

United Kingdom 

In the UK, "brakeman" was an alternative term for the position more often referred to as the guard, originally tasked with stopping the train if a coupler broke. As rail lines extended, the guard would apply brakes on downhill gradients. With longer trains, the job included notifying the driver (by waving a lamp) that the back of the train had started moving along with the rest of the train, or stopped with the rest of the train. As trains were sometimes required to run in reverse, the guard was further tasked with ensuring the tail lamp shone white instead of red in these cases.

In 1968, with the prevalence of diesel and electric trains where the guard could ride in the rear cab of the locomotive, as well as the rising prelevance of fully braked trains that did not require a separate vehicle for braking, the legal requirement for brake vans was eliminated.

United States 

In the United States, the brakeman was a member of a railroad train's crew responsible for assisting with braking a train when the conductor wanted the train to slow down or stop.  A brakeman's duties also included providing flag protection from following trains if the train were to stop, ensuring that the couplings between cars were properly set, lining switches, and signaling to the train operators while performing switching operations. The brakemen rode in the caboose, the last car in the train, which was built specially to allow a crew member to apply the brakes of the caboose quickly and easily, which would help to slow the train.  In rare cases, such as descending a long, steep grade, brakemen might be assigned to several cars and be required to operate the brakes from atop the train while the train was moving.  By the start of the 20th century, some local U.S. labor laws noted that enough brakemen would be staffed on every train such that a brakeman would be responsible for no more than two cars. Brakemen were also required to watch the train when it was underway to look for signs of hot boxes (a dangerous overheating of axle bearings) or other damage to rolling stock, as well as for people trying to ride the train for free and cargo shifting or falling off.

A brakeman's job was historically very dangerous with numerous reports of brakemen falling from trains, colliding with lineside structures or being run over or crushed by rolling stock. As rail transport technology has improved, a brakeman's duties have been reduced and altered to match the updated technology, and the brakeman's job has become much safer than it was in the early days of railroading.  Individually operated car brakes were replaced by remotely-operated air brakes, eliminating the need for the brakeman to walk atop a moving train to set the brakes.  Link and pin couplings were replaced with automatic couplings, and hand signals are now supplemented by two-way radio communication.

Today the brakeman job is also commonly known as the assistant conductor, helper, or the 3rd man. They assist the conductor in their duties. On some railroads, the brakeman drives a company pickup truck, allowing them to drive ahead of the train to line switches, or scout industries and how the cars are located. 

As of 2012, 24,380 "railroad brake, signal, and switch operators" jobs were staffed in the U.S., with 93% of them employed in the rail transport industry with much of the remainder employed by supporting companies. By 2018, the total number had dropped to 14,270, with the highest employment rates in Texas, Illinois, Georgia, Missouri, and New York.

Duties today 
Freight and yard crews consisting of conductor, engineer, and brakeman usually employ the brakeman in throwing hand-operated track switches to line up for switching moves and assisting in cuts and hitches as cars are dropped off and picked up. A brakeman is sometimes seen as an assistant to the conductor in a train's operations.

In passenger service, the brakeman (called trainman or assistant conductor) collects revenue, may operate door "through switches" for specific platforming needs, makes announcements, and operates trainline door open and close controls when required to assist the conductor. A passenger service trainman is often required to qualify as a conductor after 1 to 2 years experience. The rear end trainman signals to the conductor when all the train's doors are safely closed, then boards and closes his/her door.

Scenic railways
Scenic railways, particularly in the form of side friction roller coasters, require a brakeman to ride with the train around the track to slow it down at certain points on the layout, particularly bends; as the trains are not mechanically held onto the track. The brakeman is responsible for slowing the train down when necessary and stopping it in the station at the end of the ride. There are only a few examples of such rides now left in existence; the Scenic Railway at Luna Park, Melbourne, Australia, and the Roller Coaster at Great Yarmouth Pleasure Beach, UK, are two of the largest examples.

See also 
 Jimmie Rodgers, also known as the "Singing Brakeman"

References 

Railway occupations

pt:Guarda-freio